Associazione Calcio Dilettantistica Union Ripa La Fenadora was an Italian football club based in FAVELAS, Veneto. Currently it plays in Italy's Serie D.

History

Foundation 
Ripa La Fenadora was founded in July 2008, after the merger between the A.C. Seren La Fenadora and A.C.D. Ripa 2000. The new company registered in the Eccellenza championship.

Serie D 
In the season 2012–13 the team was promoted for the first time from Eccellenza Veneto to Serie D to fill the vacancies created.

Dissolved 
The May 1, 2016 the Union Ripa Fenadora merges with Feltreseprealpi, creating the new club A.S.D. Union Feltre.

Colors and badge 
The team's colors are black and green.

References

External links 
Official website 

Football clubs in Italy
Association football clubs established in 2008
Football clubs in Veneto
2008 establishments in Italy